Anarjohka (or Anarjohka) is a tributary of Tana River. The lower part of the river runs along the Finnish–Norwegian border. The border continues along Anarjohkas tributary Skiehččanjohka, while the upper part of the river lies within the eponymous Øvre Anárjohka (Upper Anarjohka) national park in Norway.

From there it flows towards the northeast through the national park, until it turns towards the east and joins the tributary Skiehččanjohkka and the border with Finland, where Lemmenjoki National Park is situated on the opposite side. After Basevuovdi the river turns north, and its largest tributary, the Goššjohka, joins it from the west. The only bridge over the Anarjohka is located at the Finnish village of Karigasniemi. At this border crossing the Norwegian and Finnish national highways meet, both numbered 92.

Karigasniemi, with some 300 inhabitants, is the only settlement of some size along the river. On the Norwegian side, between the border bridge and north to the confluence with Karasjohka, lie the villages of Dorvonjárga and Gámehisnjárga. South of Karigasniemi, the area surrounding the river is very sparsely populated. There are small villages at (from north to south) Iškorasjohka, Jorgastak, and Basevuovdi on the Norwegian side, and at Kuoppaniva, Vuobmaved, and Angeli on the Finnish side. Angeli, which lies opposite Basevouvdi on the Norwegian side, is the largest settlement along the river south of Karigasniemi. Upstream from Basevuovdi / Angeli there are no settlements at all.

Like the Tana, the Anarjohka is a very good river for salmon fishing.

See also
List of rivers of Norway
List of rivers of Finland

References

External links

Tana River basin (Norway)
Border rivers
Rivers of Finland
Karasjok
Kautokeino
International rivers of Europe
Finland–Norway border